Spin Psycle is a 2001 hip-hop mix album by Mix Master Mike. It was released on September 11, 2001.

Track listing

Reception

Allmusic gave a positive review of the album and praised the artist lineup, stating "Anyone who can round up all those guys for some exclusive material and have it cut up by one of the world's best DJs is bound to create something beautiful, and that's exactly what this is."

References

2001 compilation albums
Hip hop albums by American artists
Turntablism albums
DJ mix albums